To Kit Yong (born September 21, 1957) is a Hong Kong sprint canoer who competed in the mid-1980s. She was eliminated in the semifinals of the K-2 500 m event at the 1984 Summer Olympics in Los Angeles.

External links
Sports-Reference.com profile

1957 births
Canoeists at the 1984 Summer Olympics
Hong Kong female canoeists
Living people
Olympic canoeists of Hong Kong
Place of birth missing (living people)